John D. Atwell (born May 7, 1973) is an American professional racing driver. He last competed full-time in the Trans-Am Series, driving the No. 02 Chevrolet Camaro, as well as part-time in the NASCAR Camping World Truck Series, driving the No. 79 Chevrolet Silverado, both for his own team, Atwell Racing.

Racing career

Atwell races full-time in the Trans-Am Series. Due to having experience at the Circuit of the Americas, when NASCAR made its debut there, CMI Motorsports brought in Atwell to make his NASCAR Camping World Truck Series debut in the No. 49 truck. However, he posted the 41st fastest time in qualifying, which was not enough to make the race.

Atwell returned to attempt the Truck Series race at COTA in 2022, this time with his own team, which fielded the No. 79 truck, and again failed to qualify.

Motorsports career results

NASCAR
(key) (Bold – Pole position awarded by qualifying time. Italics – Pole position earned by points standings or practice time. * – Most laps led.)

Camping World Truck Series

 Season still in progress

References

External links
 

Living people
NASCAR drivers
Racing drivers from Texas
1973 births